The 1997 SEC Men’s Basketball Tournament took place from March 6–9, 1997 at The Pyramid Arena in Memphis, Tennessee. The Kentucky Wildcats men's basketball team won the tournament and the SEC’s automatic bid to the 1997 NCAA Men’s Division I Basketball Tournament by defeating the Georgia Bulldogs by a score of 95–68 in the championship game.

Television coverage 
The first round, the quarterfinals, and the semifinals were regionally televised and syndicated by Jefferson Pilot Sports. The championship game was televised nationally on CBS.

Tournament notes 
This was the second time that the Pyramid hosted the SEC Men’s Basketball Tournament. 
The 1997 tournament was Rick Pitino’s final tournament title win before he left the University of Kentucky to take a coaching job with the Boston Celtics.

Bracket

References

SEC men's basketball tournament
1996–97 Southeastern Conference men's basketball season
SEC men's basketball tournament
Basketball in Nashville, Tennessee
College sports tournaments in Tennessee